St. Michael the Archangel Catholic High School (SMA) is a private, Roman Catholic, co-educational high school in Lee's Summit, Missouri, United States. It was established in 2017 and is part of the Roman Catholic Diocese of Kansas City–Saint Joseph.

It is the first new high school built by the Diocese in over 50 years and replaced both St. Mary's and Archbishop O'Hara High Schools. It enrolls around 300 students.

References

External links 
 

Roman Catholic Diocese of Kansas City–Saint Joseph
Buildings and structures in Lee's Summit, Missouri
High schools in Jackson County, Missouri
Preparatory schools in Missouri
Catholic secondary schools in Missouri
School buildings completed in 2017
Educational institutions established in 2017
2017 establishments in Missouri